Castellcir is a village in the province of Barcelona and autonomous community of Catalonia, Spain. The municipality includes an exclave to the west. Since May 2015 it has been part of the new comarca of Moianès; previously it was in Vallès Oriental.

References

External links
 Government data pages 

Municipalities in Moianès